La Verna is a show cave in the commune of Sainte-Engrâce in the department of Pyrénées-Atlantiques in France.   of mined tunnel leads into the Salle de la Verna, the largest chamber in a show cave in the world. A river cascades into the chamber from halfway up the east wall, and sinks into boulders near the base of the chamber.

The chamber was named after the Lyon scouts, La Verna Troop, who helped in the attempted rescue of Marcel Loubens who died following a fall during the 1952 explorations.

In 2003 a standard 4 person hot-air balloon was flown in Salle de la Verna.

Geology

Most of the Gouffre de la Pierre-Saint-Martin is formed by dissolution in Cretaceous limestones, and the main river reaches a base level where it flows over insoluble schists of the Paleozoic basement rocks. The Salle de la Verna has formed where the river flows off the schist onto Devonian limestone. Over time, the river found a route through the soluble limestones, leaving the original downstream river passage (the Gallerie Aranzadi) high and dry. The chamber was formed by a process of solution and collapse, beginning about 200,000 years ago. The unconformity between the Paleozoic and Mesozoic rocks is clearly exposed in the walls of the chamber.

The river flowing through the chamber originated from the infiltration zones on the  limestone plateaus, and emerges at springs  lower, in the valley of Saint-Engrâce.

Fauna

In this mineral world lives a unique community of animals, adapted to the dark depths of the karst. They are small invertebrates, blind, and without pigmentation. The two most common species observed in La Verna are the Aphaenops loubensi and Aphaenops ochsi. In order to survive, these insects need an atmosphere saturated with humidity. After fecundation, the female lays a single egg, out of which a small larva hatches. Contrary to insects on the surface, this larva immediately metamorphoses to an adult, without feeding. The biologist Michel Cabidoche studied these animals in the 60’s. Since the opening of la Verna to visitors, in 2010, a team of researchers of the French national museum of natural history, under the leadership of Professor Arnaud Faille, closely follows their evolution.

History

13 August 1952, 10:15 PM: Marcel Loubens (1923-1952) died as a result of his injuries sustained from a fall during the explorations. He died 36 hours after the fall, which fractured his skull and spine, and also put him into a coma which he never recovered from.
13 August 1953: Georges Lépineux, Jimmy Théodor, Daniel Eppely, Michel Letrône and Georges Ballandraux, divided into two groups, discovered Salle de la Verna. One group opened the way, the other follows surveying as they went. They met in Salle de la Verna, where they inscribed their names. They had found what was at the time - and remained for many years - the world’s largest known underground chamber. They had also set a depth-record.
1956-60: The French National Electricity Company (EDF) decided to construct a tunnel. The plan was to capture the underground river that runs through the Salle de la Verna for the production of electricity. It took four years to dig the tunnel, but the project was abandoned for technical reasons. Cavers began using the tunnel as a short cut to continue their explorations.
2000: A private company, SHEM (Société Hydroélectrique du Midi) re-launched the hydro-electric power project.
January 2006: Work on the project began. An access-road was constructed and the tunnel restored. Close cooperation between SHEM, cavers and the local authorities has led to the opening of la Verna to the public.
June 2007: The local authorities working together as a SIVU (Syndicat intercommunal à vocation unique) confirmed the exploitation of the site by the Caving Associations of the Atlantic Pyrenees. To achieve this, the cavers created a small company, which organizes guided visits.
1 July 2010: La Verna opened to the public. The cave is now accessible to everybody - including those with reduced mobility.

References

External links
 La Verna cave official website

Caves of Nouvelle-Aquitaine
Show caves in France
Landforms of Pyrénées-Atlantiques
Tourist attractions in Pyrénées-Atlantiques